MTV Brasil was a Brazilian over-the-air television network owned by Grupo Abril focused on the youth and entertainment. The network was launched on 20 October 1990, as the first specialty television network to broadcast over-the-air, becoming the local version of MTV. It was the third MTV iteration launched in the world, and the first to broadcast via terrestrial television.

The network headquarters was at 52 Avenida Professor Alfonso Bovero, Sumaré, São Paulo city, which was formerly the headquarters of Rede Tupi. This building was listed by Conselho de Defesa do Patrimônio Histórico (Condephaat) as having an historical heritage, becoming the first to be officially listed in the city.

At the beginning of the 2010s, the channel was considered the largest youth network (and the seventh largest TV network) in Brazil; it is still counted by Meio&Mensagem newspaper as the fifth most-viewed TV network in the country. MTV Brasil was the first network in the country dedicated to young people, in addition to being the first TV network in Brazil to broadcast their programming 24-hours-a-day, morning and night.

The network ceased their operations on 30 September 2013, being replaced by a new channel operated by Viacom on subscription television. Its last music broadcast was “Orra Meu”. On terrestrial television, however, the network was replaced by Ideal TV.

Background 
MTV, acronym of Music Television, debuted in the United States on 20 August 1981 under the control of Warner-Amex Satellite Entertainment. Today owned by Viacom, the subscription network revolutionized the music industry worldwide with the popularization of music videos, that were showcased by hosts known as video jockeys.p, or “VJ’s”. In Brazil, the company has partnered with the Rede Bandeirantes for the broadcasting of special events, such as awards shows.

The music video itself first came to Brazil through the Rede Globo's weekly news and entertainment show Fantástico. The news magazine was the only TV show to produce and broadcast this type of programming, until the early 1980s, when the independent music video producers wanted to escape the standards imposed by the network. At the same time, MTV appeared in the North American market. Throughout the decade, other programs dedicated to music videos were created, like Clip Trip, on TV Gazeta, Som Pop, on TV Cultura, FMTV and Manchete Clip Show from the defunct Rede Manchete and the Clip Clip, broadcast by Rede Globo.

History 
MTV Brasil was launched on 20 October 1990, only to metropolitan São Paulo, through UHF channel A32 and metropolitan Rio de Janeiro, through VHF channel A9 (with TV Corcovado as an affiliate station). The first video shown was Garota de Ipanema, sung by Marina Lima.

In 1996, Viacom acquired 50% of the network, which was, until then, a wholly owned subsidiary of Abril.

In 2005, due to regulatory requirements that non-Brazilian companies can own only up to 30% of a terrestrial network, Abril acquired 20% of MTV Brasil from Viacom.

In late 2006 MTV Brasil released its broadband channel following the international model for the MTV Overdrive.

On 2 December 2007, after the official start of commercial HDTV broadcasts in Brazil, MTV launched MTV HD, a simulcast of the main MTV service, featuring original high-definition series and MTV2's $2 Bill concerts. MTV HD is currently available over-the-air in São Paulo. In January 2008, MTV changed its broadcast frequency in Rio de Janeiro from UHF channel 24 to 48. On 1 September 2008 starts transmitting on satellite Star One C2 (70°W South America coverage) by analog system PAL-M, free-to-air frequency 4010H after being encrypted since 1993. This is seen as a response to NET Brasil (a wholly owned subsidiary of Organizações Globo that distributes channels to NET Serviços – and its affiliates – and SKY Brasil) dropping MTV from its systems, after disagreeing to MTV conditioning its carriage on cable and satellite to the carriage of Abril owned channels Fiz and Ideal, which, for low viewership (especially since they were never carried by Net or Sky), were closed down in July 2009. MTV remains available on Net cable in markets where it's a must-carry station, for being a full-power broadcast station covering that market.

In December 2009, Abril announced it would purchase Viacom's stake in MTV Brasil and gain exclusive rights to use the MTV brand in Brazil.

MTV Brasil was one of the few MTV channels around the world that didn't air Laguna Beach or any of its spin-offs (such as The Hills), since they were picked up by competitor Multishow.

On 15 May 2013, journalist Keila Jimenez published an article in her blog "Outro Canal" that Grupo Abril was not going to continue to manage the channel until the end of that year, due to the risk of bankruptcy. On 12 June, Kelia posted that Grupo Abril was going to return the brand MTV to Viacom and was going to release a new channel in its place. This was later confirmed by another journalist, Patricia Kogut. A day later, MTV Brasil canceled three TV shows: Acesso MTV, MTV Sem Vergonha and A Hora do Chay and its VJs were fired. A week later, Zico Góes, head of programming on the channel, confirmed that the brand MTV was returned to Viacom and MTV Brasil was going to continue with new TV shows until the end of September. On 29 July, Viacom International Media Networks announced that the channel would be relaunched on 1 October on pay TV. Grupo Abril announced a goodbye special of the channel from free-to-air television on 30 September. In September, Grupo Abril agreed to sell the entire archive (almost 33 thousand VHS video-tapes) to Viacom. Most of the collection is being selected by Zico Góes, who is scheduled to release a book with the My MTV special shows. The last live TV show of MTV Brasil was held on 26 September, with the VJs and employees of the channel making a party around the former MTV building in Perdizes. It was held from 6 pm to midnight (BRT).

The last TV show aired was O Último Programa do Mundo ("The Last Program in the World"). Cuca Lazarotto, who introduced the first music video aired on MTV Brasil, also introduced the last music video, "Maracatu Atômico" by Chico Science & Nação Zumbi. Astrid Fontenelle appeared to give the last message aired by MTV Brasil (which was recorded in the third week of September) and close MTV Brasil's broadcasting. Fontenelle was known for being the first VJ of MTV Brasil's most famous TV show, Disk MTV. After that, the channel was replaced by Grupo Abril's Ideal TV and MTV Brasil relaunched on pay TV as only "MTV" on the following day.

See also 
 List of programs broadcast by MTV Brasil
 MTV Video Music Brazil

References

External links 
  

Grupo Abril
MTV channels
Music television channels
Portuguese-language television networks
Defunct television channels in Brazil
Television channels and stations disestablished in 2013
Television channels and stations established in 1990
1990 establishments in Brazil
2013 disestablishments in Brazil
Music organisations based in Brazil